Robert E. Watson (March 22, 1930 – January 31, 2017) was a guard who played in the National Basketball Association (NBA). Watson was drafted by the Milwaukee Hawks in the 1952 NBA draft. He first played in the NBA with the Minneapolis Lakers in 1954 before being traded back to the Milwaukee Hawks for Lew Hitch.

He died on January 31, 2017, at the age of 86.

References

1930 births
2017 deaths
Basketball players from Kentucky
Guards (basketball)
Kentucky Wildcats men's basketball players
Milwaukee Hawks draft picks
Milwaukee Hawks players
Minneapolis Lakers players
People from Central City, Kentucky